Chesaning (YTB-769) was a United States Navy  named for Chesaning, Michigan.

Construction

The contract for Chesaning was awarded 18 January 1963. She was laid down on 17 July 1963 at Mobile, Alabama by Mobile Ship Repair and launched 5 February 1964.

Operational history

Delivered to the Navy on 16 June 1964, Chesaning was assigned to the 6th Fleet at Naval Base La Maddelena, Italy.

Stricken from the Navy Directory 25 May 2005, ex-Chesaning was sold 14 September 2006.

References

External links
 

Natick-class large harbor tugs
Ships built in Mobile, Alabama
1964 ships